(Disappearance of the Capital) is a 1987 Japanese science fiction film directed by Toshio Masuda. It is based on Sakyo Komatsu's novel Shuto shōshitsu which won the 6th Nihon SF Taisho Award in 1985. The film's score was composed by Maurice Jarre, and special effects were directed by Teruyoshi Nakano.

Plot
One day, Tokyo and its metropolitan area are suddenly covered by a giant dome-shaped and electromagnetic "cloud" for an unknown reason, and the whole thing seemed to disappear and all communications with the outside of "the cloud" are cut off.

Therefore, governments and scientific researchers in various places were extremely shocked and hurriedly organized to study countermeasures. But people are unable to cross "the cloud" into the Tokyo metropolitan area.

The Soviet Navy fleet is getting close near Hokkaido, and the U.S. is forcing Japan to form a new government. So an emergency national governor's meeting was held, and made the national governor's meeting a transitional agency of state affairs.

Scientists outside "the cloud" try to rescue 20 million lives in "the cloud" by using artificial high-power electromagnetic jammers.

Cast
Tsunehiko Watase as Tatsuya Asakura, General Manager of Hokuto Electric's Technology Development Department
Yūko Natori as Mariko Koide, freelance journalist
Shinji Yamashita as Yosuke Tamiya, Kansai Broadcasting Press
Isao Natsuyagi as Eiji Sakuma, JASDF
Ichirō Zaitsu as Kawamura, Director of Kansai Broadcasting Press
Yōko Ishino as Mieko Matsunaga, college student and part-time employee at Hokuto Electric Research Institute
Raita Ryū as Horie, Deputy Director, Ministry of Foreign Affairs, International Bureau
Ittoku Kishibe as Yasuhara, member of Hokuto Electric Research Institute
Yoshie Taira as Yumiko Asakura, wife of Tatsuya Asakura
Sei Hiraizumi as Wada, Kansai Broadcasting Society Department Desk
Shōji Yasui as Ambassador to the United States Otsuki
Kei Taguchi as Ambassador to the United Kingdom Uekusa
Renji Ishibashi as Miyoshi, Secretary of the Ministry of Posts and Telecommunications
Haruko Katō as Umeko Koide, Mariko's mother
Norihei Miki as Matsukichi Kimura
Fumio Watanabe as Osaka Prefecture Governor Komuro
Hideji Ōtaki as Professor Otawara
Tetsurō Tamba as Representative Nakata
Source for cast

Release
Tokyo Blackout was released theatrically in Japan on 11 January 1987 where it was distributed by Toho. It was released in the United States by Toho International on 29 August 1987.

References

Footnotes

Sources

External links
 
 

1987 films
Japanese science fiction films
Daiei Film tokusatsu films
1980s science fiction films
Cold War films
Films based on science fiction novels
Films set in Kanagawa Prefecture
Films scored by Maurice Jarre
Films directed by Toshio Masuda
Daiei Film films
1980s Japanese films